Marion Wagner (born 9 June 1968) is a German archer. She competed in the women's individual and team events at the 1992 Summer Olympics.

References

External links
 

1968 births
Living people
German female archers
Olympic archers of Germany
Archers at the 1992 Summer Olympics
People from Hochsauerlandkreis
Sportspeople from Arnsberg (region)
20th-century German women